The Comeback Player of the Year Award can refer to:

Baseball

Major League Baseball
Major League Baseball Comeback Player of the Year Award
Players Choice Award (Players Choice Awards Comeback Player)
Sporting News Comeback Player of the Year Award

Other baseball
CPBL Most Progressive Award – Chinese Professional Baseball League (Taiwan; Republic of China)
Nippon Professional Baseball Comeback Player of the Year Award (Japan)

Other sports
MLS Comeback Player of the Year Award – Major League Soccer
NBA Comeback Player of the Year Award – National Basketball Association
National Football League Comeback Player of the Year Award – National Football League
John Cullen Award - International Hockey League